A capon is a cockerel whose reproductive organs were removed at an early age.

Capon may also refer to:

 Capon (surname)
 Capon Chapel, a landmark in West Virginia
 Fort Capon, a stockade fort

See also
 Capon Bridge
 Capon Lake, West Virginia
 Capon Springs, West Virginia
 Capon Springs Run
 Capon Oak Tree
 Kapon